Ranghieri is an Italian surname. The history of this surname goes back to Medieval times. Ranghieri are originated from Westfalia (Germany) around the year 1000. The Ranghieri family moved to Italy and settle down in Verona area.

Notable people with the surname include:
Giovan Battista Ranghieri approx. 1600 sculptor in Verona North of Italy
Walter Ranghieri, (born in 1895) Italian sport and Olimpic wrestler,
Alex Ranghieri (born 1987), Italian beach volleyball player

Italian-language surnames
Giovan Battista Ranghieri 
Giovan Battista Ranghieri
Walter Ranghieri